The Rainbow is a BBC television three-episode serial of 1988 directed by Stuart Burge, adapted from the D. H. Lawrence novel The Rainbow (1915).

Outline
Ursula Brangwen is the eldest child of Will Brangwen, a farmer, and his wife Anna. She has a fascination with rainbows and one day she runs away from home looking for the pot of gold at the end of one.

As a teenager, Ursula has a crush on Winifred Inger, her gym mistress at the girls' high school, and she also has romantic feelings for Anton Skrebensky, who is at the boys' high school. They spend a lot of time together, including hill walking. Ursula agrees to become a nude model for a local artist, but she walks out after he makes a pass at her. She is jealous when Winifred gets engaged to her Uncle Henry. Ursula and Anton leave school. He joins the army and goes to fight in the Second Boer War, while she moves to London and gets a job as a schoolteacher at an elementary school in the East End of London, where she has to fend off unwanted advances from the headmaster of the school.

A year later, in the spring of 1901, Ursula returns to the farm and meets Anton, just home from the war, and they begin an affair. Ursula also starts to work for the Derbyshire miners union. When she thinks she is pregnant, Anton wants to marry her, but she turns him down, and he goes away. After fighting off an attempted rape by two miners, Ursula gets a telegram from Anton to say he has married someone else and has been posted to British India.

During a rainstorm, a rainbow appears, and Ursula packs a suitcase and again runs away from home, chasing the rainbow.

Her story is continued in D. H. Lawrence's novel Women in Love.

Cast
 Imogen Stubbs as Ursula Brangwen
 Robyn Cooper as Young Ursula Brangwen
 Martin Wenner as Anton Skrebensky
 Kate Buffery as Winifred Inger
 Colin Tarrant as Will Brangwen
 Jane Gurnett as Anna Brangwen
 John Evitts as Mr Harby
 John Tams as Mr Brunt
 Clare Holman as Gudrun Brangwen
 Roy Spencer as Vicar
 Emma Kedge as Ethel
 Martin Bettridge as Billy Brangwen
Tom Bell as Old Tom Brangwen 
Jon Finch as Uncle Tom
Eileen Way as Lydia Brangwen 
Claire Thompson as Catherine
Kathryn Brown as Cassie
Tom Bailey as Williams
Paul Duke as Billy
Emma Chambers as Margaret
Sarah-Jane Holm as Dorothy
Fabia Drake as Aunt Olga
David Beames as Uncle Fred
Phyllida Hewatt as Mrs Phillips
Amelda Brown as Maggie Schofield
Marjie Lawrence as Ethel
Lola Almudevar as Catherine Brangwen
Dilys Hamlett as Dr Frankstone
Sarah Crowden as Catherine Phillips
Cate Hamer as Louisa Phillips
John MacKay as Eddie
Graeme Aston as Wright
Graham Barlow as Hill
Annette Kashdan as Cassie 
Amy Bell as Young Anna Brangwen
Laurie Eastwood as Margaret Brangwen
Suzy Roper as Theresa Brangwen
Aran Bell as Clem Phillips
Brian Hickey as David Schofield

References

External links

1988 British television series debuts
1988 British television series endings
1980s British drama television series
British historical television series
BBC television dramas
Television series by BBC Studios
BBC Birmingham productions
1980s British television miniseries
Television series set in the 1910s
Television shows based on British novels
English-language television shows
Television shows set in Derbyshire
Films based on works by D. H. Lawrence
Films directed by Stuart Burge